The Online Lenders Alliance (OLA) is an industry association that represents members of the online financial services community. The OLA sets best practices and standards for online lending businesses and monitors the Internet for bad actors operating in the field. OLA members account for an estimated 80% of the nation's small-dollar online lending volume.

History
The Online Lenders Alliance does not respond to letters requesting information about their members.

In addition to setting industry standards, the OLA has been recognized for their significant influence on federal policy,  most notably weighing in on issues related to hidden interest rates created by malicious online lenders, and industry concerns related to online advertising. Mary Jackson currently serves as CEO of the Online Lenders Alliance.

References 

Finance industry associations
Online financial services companies
Organizations with year of establishment missing